Leeladhwaj Thapa (Nepali:लीलाध्वज थापा) was a Nepali novel writer. He was awarded Madan Puraskar for the novel Mann (English: Heart) in 2014 B.S. It was the second year of Madan Puraskar. Mann is the first novel to be awarded Madan Puraskar. It was based on Nepali society.

His other work is Sabaiko Lagi published in 2026 B.S.

References

1921 births
Nepalese male writers
Nepali-language writers
1984 deaths
Madan Puraskar winners
People from Kathmandu